Głuszczyzna  is a village in the administrative district of Gmina Głusk, within Lublin County, Lublin Voivodeship, in eastern Poland.

The Czerniowka rivers flows through Głuszczyzna. There is a bus terminal of the city of Lublin in Głuszczyzna.

References

Villages in Lublin County